Astura could refer to:
 Torre Astura, a former island of Lazio, Italy, containing Roman villas
 , Lazio, Italy
 Esla River, a river of Spain known to the Romans as Astura
 Astura (moth), a synonym for Polygrammodes, a genus of moths of the family Crambidae
 Lancia Astura, a passenger car produced by Italian automobile manufacturer Lancia between 1931 and 1939